Government Degree College Badaber (Badhber) Peshawar is a public sector degree college located in Badaber, Peshawar Khyber Pakhtunkhwa in Pakistan.

Overview & History 
Government Degree College Badaber (Badhber) Peshawar was established in 1987 at Badaber near Masho Gagar around 13 km south of Peshawar. The college started initially as Intermediate level college but was updated to Degree college in 1998. The college offers courses at Intermediate level in both Science & Arts group and affiliated with Board of Intermediate & Secondary Education Peshawar. The college also offers BA and BSc course in Biological Sciences, Physical Sciences and Social Sciences/Humanities and affiliated with University of Peshawar.

Objectives 
The main objective of the college is to take the students from darkness into light and to impart quality education. The college tries its best to provide excellent learning and knowledge oriented environment to the students and to play leading role in the development of nation and country.

Departments And Faculties 
The college currently has the following departments and faculties.

Social Sciences/Humanities
 Department of Civics
 Department of Pakistan Studies
 Department of English
 Department of Economics
 Department of Geography
 Department of Health & Physical Education
 Department of History
 Department of Islamiyat
 Department of Law
 Department of Urdu
 Department of Political Science
 Department of Library Science
 Department of Pashto

Physical Sciences
 Department of Chemistry
 Department of Computer Science
 Department of Mathematics
 Department of Physics
 Department of Statistics

Biological Sciences
 Department of Biology

See also  
 Edwardes College Peshawar
 Islamia College Peshawar
 Government College Peshawar
 Government Superior Science College Peshawar
 Government College Hayatabad Peshawar
 Government Degree College Naguman Peshawar
 Government Degree College Mathra Peshawar
 Government Degree College Badaber Peshawar
 Government Degree College Chagarmatti Peshawar
 Government Degree College Wadpagga Peshawar
 Government Degree College Achyni Payan Peshawar

References

External links 
 Government Degree College Badaber (Badhber) Peshawar Official Website

Colleges in Peshawar
Universities and colleges in Peshawar